Richard Walter may refer to:

Richard Walter (psychologist), American forensic psychologist
Richard Walter (writer), American author, educator and screenwriter
Richard Walter (footballer) (born 1959), former Australian footballer
Richard Walter (archaeologist), New Zealand archaeologist
Richard H. Walter (1920–2016), American politician in the state of Iowa
Richard Walter (chaplain), author of Lord Anson's memoir, with some input by Benjamin Robins
Richard Walter (actor), British actor and son of actor Wilfred Walter

See also
Richard Water (died 1416), MP for Canterbury

Richard Walters (disambiguation)